Rodowicz is a Polish surname. Notable people with the surname include:

Jan Rodowicz (1923–1949), Polish Army officer and Scout
Maryla Rodowicz (born 1945), Polish singer and actress

Polish-language surnames